The Inland Valley Daily Bulletin is a daily newspaper based in Ontario, California, serving the Pomona Valley and southwest San Bernardino County. The Daily Bulletin is a member of the Southern California News Group (formerly the Los Angeles Newspaper Group), a division of Digital First Media. After 30 years of operations from its Ontario Office, the Daily Bulletin moved to Rancho Cucamonga in 2015.

Donrey Media formed the paper in 1990 by merging the Progress Bulletin of Pomona with The Daily Report of Ontario. Donrey had owned both papers since 1967. It is owned by Digital First Media, which took control of the paper in 1999.

The coverage area for the Daily Bulletin includes Pomona, San Dimas, La Verne and Claremont in Los Angeles County, Chino, Chino Hills, Montclair, Ontario, Rancho Cucamonga and Upland in San Bernardino County.

References

External links

Inland Valley Daily Bulletin website

Daily newspapers published in Greater Los Angeles
Mass media in the Inland Empire
Mass media in San Bernardino County, California
Pomona Valley
Rancho Cucamonga, California
Publications established in 1990
1990 establishments in California
MediaNews Group publications
Digital First Media